The SEA IV was a French two-seat military aircraft of World War I and the immediate post-war era.

Development
The SEA IV was designed and built in 1917 by Henry Potez, Louis Coroller, and Marcel Bloch. It was a derivative of their previous SEA II design, equipped with a more powerful Lorraine engine of 261 kW (350 hp). It made its first flight during the first quarter of 1918, probably near Plessis-Belleville. It was initially tested by Gustave Douchy, a flying ace of 9 victories, then by the pilots of the Centre d'essais en Vol at Villacoublay. The "Ministère de l'Armement et des Fabrications de guerre" (Ministry of Armament and War Production) soon placed an order for 1,000 machines, making the SEA IV the first Dassault-designed aircraft to reach production.

Operational history
On August 24, 1918, General Duval, commander of Aéronautique at General Headquarters foresaw the need for two variants to equip the escadrilles at the beginning of 1919: the SEA IV A2 for observation and the SEA IV C2 for fighting. In October, General Headquarters ordered the commissioning of a flotilla to operate these aircraft, and therefore required production to reach 200 planes per month during the first quarter of 1919, to have a force of 400 on hand by April 1.

The Armistice, however, meant that the initial order of 1,000 was cancelled, and in the end, only 115 examples were built. These C2s were used for a number of years by several escadrilles in the "Regiments d'Aviation" at Le Bourget.

A further 25 were built by Aéroplanes Henry Potez as the Potez VII, a luxury touring aircraft, and one further example formed the basis of a racing aircraft.

Variants
SEA IV Basic production variant
SEA IV P.M.A long-distance aircraft with additional fuel tanks giving an endurance of 6 hours.
SEA IV floatplane Under construction at the time of the Armistice in November 1918

Operators

Specifications (SEA IV C2)

See also

References

Bibliography

Further reading

External links
 Dassault official home page

Biplanes
1910s French fighter aircraft
1910s French military reconnaissance aircraft
Single-engined tractor aircraft
Aircraft first flown in 1918
Marcel Dassault